Thomas Jefferson High School is a public high school in San Antonio, Texas, United States, and is one of ten high schools in the San Antonio Independent School District. Completed in 1932 at a cost of $1,250,000, it was the third high school built in the city. In 2015, the school was rated "Met Standard" by the Texas Education Agency.

History

The SAISD school board paid $94,588.75 to buy "Spanish Acres," a  property, to develop the third high school in San Antonio. Construction began in the fall of 1930 and ended in January 1932. It was built for over $1.25 million.

In 1983 it became a part of the National Register of Historic Places. It was also designated a Texas historic landmark.

Campus and architecture
The school was designed by the company Adams and Adams. The entrance has two towers of different heights and is designed in the Baroque style. The towers are topped with silver. The school uses wrought-iron balconies and Spanish-tiled roofing. The school has two courtyards, both landscaped, bordered by portales. One courtyard has a hexagonal pond with decorative tiling. Hannibal and Eugene Pianta, an Italian immigrant and his son, decorated the main entrance columns and balconies with cast-stone ornamentation. Jay C. Henry, the author of Architecture in Texas: 1895-1945, stated that the architecture is similar to that of Lubbock High School.

In 1938 the school had an armory, a cafeteria, a drill ground, two gymnasiums, and a theater.

A music facility and the East Wing, a three-story addition, were built at a later time.

Its Moorish/Spanish architecture make it a visually distinct element in what was the old Woodlawn district.

Recognition
In 1983 Jefferson was listed on the National Register of Historic Places. In 1995, it was included in the Local Historic District by the City of San Antonio. In 2010, Jefferson was selected as Grammy Signature Award Winner.

Demographics
The demographic breakdown of the 1,829 students enrolled in 2012-2013 was:
Male - 52.7%
Female - 47.3%
Native American/Alaskan - 0.1%
Asian/Pacific islanders - 0.2%
Black - 2.1%
Hispanic - 95.4%
White - 2.1%
Multiracial - 0.1%

86.6% of the students were eligible for free or reduced lunch.

In 1938 the school had 2,394 students. At the time over 60% of the students were scheduled to matriculate to universities and colleges. In addition there were 89 teachers, including 56 female teachers. The student-teacher ratio at the time was 25 to 1.

Student life
In 1938 the school had an ROTC unit, multiple school-recognized clubs including the girls' pep squad "Lassos", and fraternities and sororities unrecognized by the school. As of 1938 the "Lassos" were made up of 150 female students.

In 1938 the ROTC had 33 student officers, all male; each were allowed to choose a female student to accompany him.

The 1940 Twentieth Century Fox film High School used exteriors and back-projection footage shot at TJHS.

Athletics
The Jefferson Mustangs compete in the following sports:

Baseball
Basketball
Cross Country
Football
Golf
Soccer
Softball
Swimming and Diving
Tennis
Track and Field
Volleyball

Notable alumni

Athletics
Rick Bullock, All-American basketball player, Texas Tech University
Ruth Lessing, All-American Girls Professional Baseball League
Corky Nelson, football coach, University of North Texas
Tommy Nobis, All American football player, University of Texas; 5-time Pro Bowl selection for Atlanta Falcons
Gabriel Rivera, All American football player, Texas Tech University 
Kyle Rote, All American football player, Southern Methodist University; 4-time Pro Bowl selection for New York Giants

Arts and entertainment
"Blue" Gene Tyranny, avant-garde composer and pianist
Philip Krumm, composer and pioneer of modal, repetitive pattern music
Holly Dunn, country music artist
Chris Pérez, Grammy Award-winning artist

Communications
Jim Lehrer, television journalist, MacNeil/Lehrer Report, PBS
Allen Ludden, television personality

Education
John Silber, President, Boston University

Government
John H. Wood, Jr. (deceased), Federal Judge
Ed Garza, former Mayor of the City of San Antonio
Julian Castro, United States Secretary of Housing and Urban Development, former Mayor of the City of San Antonio
Joaquin Castro, United States House of Representatives
Henry B. Gonzalez (deceased) Class of 1935, former United States congressman. The San Antonio Convention Center is named after him. 
John W. Goode (deceased) (Class of 1939), lawyer and Republican political figure of the 1950s and 1960s
Leticia Van de Putte, former Texas state senator
George C. Windrow, member of the Wisconsin Assembly

Military
 Lt. Col. Robert G. Cole (deceased), a Commander in the Invasion of Normandy, World War II, Medal of Honor recipient; Cole High School is named for him
 Major Gen. Alfred Valenzuela, commanded the U.S. Army South (USARSO) at Fort Buchanan, Puerto Rico.

Physical science
Aaron Cohen, former NASA Deputy Director
Robert Floyd Curl, Jr., Nobel Prize in Chemistry in 1996
William E. Moerner, Nobel Prize in Chemistry in 2014

References

General references
 Henry, Jay C. Architecture in Texas: 1895-1945. University of Texas Press, 1993. , 9780292730724.

External links

 Official School Website
 Jefferson Architecture
 "Historic Marker Application: Thomas Jefferson High School" - at the University of North Texas
 Thomas Jefferson High School Historical Preservation Society

High schools in San Antonio
School buildings on the National Register of Historic Places in Texas
National Register of Historic Places in San Antonio
San Antonio Independent School District high schools
Recorded Texas Historic Landmarks
1932 establishments in Texas